The Monster Single of the Year award was first introduced to the MTV Music Video Awards in 2007, as they were revamped that year and a few new awards were introduced.  When the VMAs returned to their old format in 2008, though, this award was not brought back. However the concept of the award returned as Song of the Year" 11 years after it was originally presented

References 

MTV Video Music Awards
Awards established in 2007
Awards disestablished in 2007